Giuseppe Natali (1652–1722) was an Italian painter of the Baroque period, active mainly in Cremona and Lombardy.

Biography
He was born in Casalmaggiore, near Cremona. He was the son of a Giovanni Battista Natali (Bologna, c 1630 - Cremona, c 1700) and grandson of Carlo Natali (il Guardolino), and pupil of Pietro da Cortona in Rome, returned to work in Cremona.

He became a noted painter of quadratura, and received his first training locally with Girolamo Pellizoni Crescini. and was influenced by painters of this genre in Rome and Bologna, including Girolamo Curti, Angelo Michele Colonna, and Agostino Mitelli. His brothers Francesco, Lorenzo, and Pietro were assistants in his studio. He had a son and nephew, named Giovanni Battista Natali, both painters.

Among his works in Cremona, are frescoes for the following sites:
Chapel of St Catherine in Church of San Domenico
Parish church of Sant'Andrea
St Andrew Crucified altar church of San Pietro al Po
Presbytery of San Sigismondo
Church of San Domenico at the porta delle Beccarie vecchie
Chapel in Church of San Imerio 
Church of San Sigismondo
Church of San Francesco: altarpiece

References

1652 births
1722 deaths
17th-century Italian painters
Italian male painters
18th-century Italian painters
Italian Renaissance painters
Quadratura painters
Painters from Lombardy
Painters from Cremona
18th-century Italian male artists